Any Gun Can Play is a 1967 spaghetti Western starring Gilbert Roland, Edd Byrnes and George Hilton. The film is directed by Enzo G. Castellari. The film is about a group of cowboys searching for gold, double-leading to double crosses as they continually change allegiances and get the upper hand only to be thwarted by fellow outlaws, mysterious insurance investigators and each other.

Cast

Release
Any Gun Can Play was released in Italy in 1967. The film has also been released under the English titles Go Kill and Come Back and Blood River.

References

Sources

External links

1967 films
1967 Western (genre) films
Spaghetti Western films
1960s Italian-language films
English-language Italian films
1960s English-language films
Films directed by Enzo G. Castellari
Films scored by Francesco De Masi
Films shot in Almería
Films scored by Alessandro Alessandroni
1960s multilingual films
Italian multilingual films
Revisionist Western (genre) films
1960s Italian films